The Roman Catholic Diocese of San Juan Bautista (de las Misiones) is a southern suffragan Latin Catholic diocese in the Ecclesiastical province of Asunción, which covers all of Paraguay (except the pre-diocesan missions).

History 
 On January 19, 1957, the Diocese of San Juan Bautista (de Las Misiones) was established on territories split off from the Metropolitan Archdiocese of Asunción and from the Diocese of Villarrica

Special churches 
Its cathedral episcopal see is Catedral San Juan Bautista, dedicated to John the Baptist,  in the city of San Juan Bautista de las Misiones in Misiones Department

It also has a Minor Basilica : the Marian Basílica Nuestra Señora del Pilar, dedicated to Our Lady of Pilar, in Pilar, Paraguay, Ñeembucu.

Statistics 
As per 2014, it pastorally served 227,000 Catholics (98.3% of 231,000 total) on 21,700 km² in 30 parishes and 139 missions with 35 priests (19 diocesan, 16 religious), 2 deacons, 63 lay religious (18 brothers, 45 sisters) and 5 seminarians.

Bishops

(all Roman rite natives)

Episcopal ordinaries
Suffragan Bishops of San Juan Bautista de las Misiones  
 Ramón Bogarín Argaña (January 19, 1957 – death September 3, 1976), also President of Episcopal Conference of Paraguay (1970 – 1973); previously Titular Bishop of Bagis (1954.12.01 – 1957.01.19) as Auxiliary Bishop of Asunción (Paraguay) (1954.12.01 – 1957.01.19)
 Carlos Milcíades Villalba Aquino (July 25, 1978 – retired July 22, 1999), died January 8, 2016
  Mario Melanio Medina Salinas (July 22, 1999 – retired 2017.02.16); previously Bishop of Benjamín Aceval (Paraguay) (1980.06.28 – 1997.07.08) and Coadjutor Bishop of San Juan Bautista (1997.07.08 – succession 1999.07.22)
 Pedro Collar Noguera (2017.02.16 – ...); previously Titular Bishop of Thamugadi (2016.04.23 – 2017.02.16) as Auxiliary Bishop of Ciudad del Este (Paraguay) (2016.04.23 – 2017.02.16).

Coadjutor bishop
Mario Melanio Medina Salinas (1997-1999)

See also 
 List of Catholic dioceses in Paraguay

Sources and external links 
 GCatholic.org, with Google map and - satellite photo
 Catholic Hierarchy

References

Roman Catholic dioceses in Paraguay
Roman Catholic Ecclesiastical Province of Asunción
Christian organizations established in 1957
Roman Catholic dioceses and prelatures established in the 20th century
Misiones Department
1957 establishments in Paraguay